Magenta is a commune in the Marne department in north-eastern France.

In 2017 it had a population of 1,708. It was named after the 1859 Battle of Magenta, now in Italy.

See also
Communes of the Marne department

References

External links

 

Communes of Marne (department)